Japanese Democratic Party can refer to:

Democratic Party (Japan, 1947)
Japan Democratic Party (1954)
Democratic Party of Japan (1996)
Democratic Party of Japan (1998–2016)
Democratic Party (Japan) (2016–2018)

See also
List of political parties in Japan